Asaperda wadai is a species of beetle in the family Cerambycidae. It was described by Makihara in 1980.

References

Asaperda
Beetles described in 1980